.gy is the Internet country code top-level domain (ccTLD) for Guyana. It is administered and managed by the Centre for Information Technology in the University of Guyana.

Second-Level Domain Names
 .co.gy
 .com.gy
 .org.gy
 .net.gy
 .edu.gy
 .gov.gy

See also
 Internet in Guyana
LACNIC
Commonwealth Telecommunications Organisation

References

External links
 IANA .gy whois information
 .gy Registry

Country code top-level domains
Communications in Guyana

sv:Toppdomän#G